Kiss is an American hard rock band from New York City, USA. Formed in January 1973, the group originally featured rhythm guitarist Paul Stanley, bassist Gene Simmons, lead guitarist Ace Frehley and drummer Peter Criss, all of whom contributed to vocals. The band's lineup remained stable for seven years, before Criss left on May 18, 1980 after an injury and increasing personal tensions. He was replaced by Eric Carr, after Anton Fig filled in for 1979's Dynasty and 1980's Unmasked. Two years later Frehley also left the band.

Frehley was replaced by Vinnie Vincent, who debuted with the group in December 1982 after contributing to Creatures of the Night earlier in the year. Vincent also performed on Lick It Up, but was fired at the end of the album's promotional touring cycle in March 1984 for what Simmons called "unethical behavior". He was replaced the following month by Mark St. John, who performed on Animalize. After contracting arthritis which made it difficult to perform, he was temporarily replaced on the Animalize World Tour by Bruce Kulick; however, when his condition failed to improve, the replacement was made permanent in December and St. John was fired.

The lineup featuring Kulick was the most stable since the band's first incarnation, only ending on November 24, 1991 when Carr died of heart cancer. Due to his illness, Carr was temporarily replaced by Eric Singer for the recording of Revenge, and upon Carr's death Singer joined the band permanently. After performing with the band for several songs as part of MTV Unplugged the previous year, Frehley and Criss officially rejoined Kiss in April 1996 for a reunion tour. The group released new album Psycho Circus in 1998, but by January 2001 had splintered again, as Criss left between legs of the Kiss Farewell Tour and was replaced by Singer.

The following year, Frehley also left Kiss for a second time, with Tommy Thayer taking over his position in March 2002. In October that year, the band announced a special show with the Melbourne Symphony to feature original drummer Criss, who subsequently remained a full-time member. By February 2004, Criss was out of the band for a third time, with Singer returning to take his place again. With the current lineup, Kiss has released two studio albums: 2009's Sonic Boom and 2012's Monster.

Members

Current

Former

Touring

Session

Timeline

Lineups

References

External links
Kiss official website

 
Kiss